Glitch is a genre of electronic music that emerged in the 1990s. It is distinguished by the deliberate use of glitch-based audio media and other sonic artifacts.

The glitching sounds featured in glitch tracks usually come from audio recording device or digital electronics malfunctions, such as CD skipping, electric hum, digital or analog distortion, circuit bending, bit-rate reduction, hardware noise, software bugs, computer crashes, vinyl record hiss or scratches, and system errors. Sometimes devices that were already broken are used, and sometimes devices are broken expressly for this purpose. In Computer Music Journal, composer and writer Kim Cascone classified glitch as a subgenre of electronica and used the term post-digital to describe the glitch aesthetic.

History 
The origins of the glitch aesthetic can be traced to the early 20th century with Luigi Russolo's Futurist manifesto L'arte dei rumori (The Art of Noises) (1913), the basis of noise music.  He constructed mechanical noise generators, which he named intonarumori, and wrote multiple compositions to be played by them, including Risveglio di una città (Awakening of a City) and Convegno di automobili e aeroplani (The Meeting of Automobiles and Airplanes). In 1914, a riot broke out at one of his performances in Milan, Italy. Later musicians and composers who made use of malfunctioning technology include Michael Pinder of The Moody Blues in "The Best Way to Travel" (1968) and Christian Marclay, who used mutilated vinyl records to create sound collages beginning in 1979. Yasunao Tone used damaged CDs in his Techno Eden performance of 1985, while Nicolas Collins's 1992 album It Was a Dark and Stormy Night included a composition featuring a string quartet playing alongside the stuttering sound of skipping CDs. Yuzo Koshiro and Motohiro Kawashima's electronic soundtrack for the 1994 video game Streets of Rage 3 used automatically randomized sequences to generate "unexpected and odd" experimental sounds.

Glitch originated as a distinct movement in Germany and Japan during the 1990s, with the musical work and labels (especially Mille Plateaux) of Achim Szepanski in Germany, and the work of Ryoji Ikeda  in Japan.

Nuno Canavarro's Plux Quba, released in 1988, incorporated pristine electroacoustic sounds that resembled early glitch. Oval's Wohnton, produced in 1993, helped define the genre by adding  and ambient aesthetics.

The earliest uses of the term glitch as related to music include electronic duo Autechre's song "Glitch" (1994) and experimental electronic group ELpH's album Worship the Glitch (1995).

Production techniques 
In the latter half of the 20th century, the experimental music that served as the precursor to glitch contained distortions that were often produced by manual manipulation of audio media. This came in the form of Yasunao Tone's "wounded" CDs; small bits of semi-transparent tape were placed on the CD to interrupt the reading of the audio information. Other examples of this manual tampering include Nicholas Collins' modification of an electric guitar to act as a resonator for electrical signals, and his adaption of a CD player to allow recordings played on it to be altered during live performance. Skipping CDs, scratched vinyl records, circuit bending, and other distortions resembling electronic noise figure prominently into the creation of rhythm and feeling in glitch; it is from the use of these digital artifacts that the genre derives its name. However, glitch today is often produced on computers using digital production software to splice together small "cuts" (samples) of music from previously recorded works. These cuts are then integrated with the signature of glitch music: beats made up of glitches, clicks, scratches, and otherwise erroneous-sounding noise. The glitches are often very short, and are typically used in place of traditional percussion or instrumentation. Popular software for creating glitch music includes trackers like Jeskola Buzz and Renoise, as well as modular software like Reaktor, Ableton Live, Reason, AudioMulch, Bidule, SuperCollider, FLStudio, Max/MSP, Pure Data, and ChucK. Some artists also use digital synthesizers like the Clavia Nord Modular G2 and Elektron's Machinedrum and Monomachine.

See also 
 Circuit bending
 Clicks & Cuts Series
 Drill 'n' bass
 Experimental pop
 Generative music
 Glitch Hop
 Hyperpop
 Microsound
 Noise music
 Raster-Noton

References

Further reading 
 Andrews, Ian, Post-digital Aesthetics and the return to Modernism, MAP-uts lecture, 2000, available at author's website.
 Bijsterveld, Karin and Trevor J. Pinch. 'Should One Applaud?': Breaches and Boundaries in the Reception of New Technology in Music." Technology and Culture. Ed. 44.3, pp. 536–559. 2003.
 Byrne, David. "What is Blip Hop?" Luakabop, 2002. Available here. 
 Collins, Adam, "Sounds of the system: the emancipation of noise in the music of Carsten Nicolai", Organised Sound, 13(1): 31–39. 2008. Cambridge University Press.
 Collins, Nicolas. Editor. "Composers inside Electronics: Music after David Tudor."  Leonardo Music Journal. Vol. 14, pp. 1–3.  2004.
 Krapp, Peter, Noise Channels: Glitch and Error in Digital Culture. Minneapolis: University of Minnesota Press 2011.
 Prior, Nick, "Putting a Glitch in the Field: Bourdieu, Actor Network Theory and Contemporary Music", Cultural Sociology, 2: 3, 2008: pp. 301–319.
 Thomson, Phil, "Atoms and errors: towards a history and aesthetics of microsound", Organised Sound, 9(2): 207–218. 2004. Cambridge University Press.
 Sangild, Torben: "Glitch—The Beauty of Malfunction" in Bad Music. Routledge (2004) 
 Young, Rob: "Worship the Glitch", The Wire 190/191 (2000)
 Noah Zimmerman, "Dusted Reviews, 2002"

Electronic music genres
Noise music